Paul Guenther may refer to:

Paul Guenther (American football) (born 1971), American football coach
Paul Günther (1882–1959), German diver